Council of Orange may refer to:
Council of Orange (441), a synod dealing with the obligations of the clergy
Council of Orange (529), a synod condemning Semi-Pelagianism